Budig is a surname. Notable people with this surname include:
 Ernst Budig (1908–1971), German swimmer
 Gene Budig (1939–2020), American baseball executive and academic administrator
 Rebecca Budig (born 1973), American actress and television presenter

Other uses
 , named for Gene Budig

See also
 Buding